Austria participated in the Eurovision Song Contest 2015 with the song "I Am Yours" written by Jimmy Harry, Dominic Muhrer, Paul Estrela, Florian Meindl and Markus Christ. The song was performed by the band The Makemakes. In addition to participating in the contest, the Austrian broadcaster Österreichischer Rundfunk (ORF) also hosted the Eurovision Song Contest after winning the competition in 2014 with the song "Rise Like a Phoenix" performed by Conchita Wurst. ORF organised the national final Wer singt für Österreich? in order to select the Austrian entry for the 2015 contest in Vienna. Sixteen artists competed over three televised shows resulting in the selection of six finalists with a potential Eurovision song each. In the final, ten international juries and a public vote first selected the top two entries to proceed to a second round of voting. In the second round, "I Am Yours" performed by The Makemakes was selected as the winner after gaining 78% of the votes from a public vote.

As the host country, Austria qualified to compete directly in the final of the Eurovision Song Contest. Austria's running order position was determined by draw. Performing in position 14 during the final, Austria placed twenty-sixth out of the 27 participating countries and failed to score any points. This was the fourth time the nation received nul points in the history of the competition.

Background

The Austrian national broadcaster,  (ORF), broadcasts the event within Austria and organises the selection process for the nation's entry. For the 2014 Eurovision Song Contest, ORF held an internal selection to choose the artist and song to represent Austria at the contest. On 26 September 2014, the broadcaster announced that the Austrian entry for the 2015 contest would be selected through a national final.

Before Eurovision

Wer singt für Österreich?
Wer singt für Österreich? (Who sings for Austria?) was the national final that selected Austria's entry for the Eurovision Song Contest 2015. The competition consisted of a four-week-long process that commenced on 20 February 2015 and concluded with a winning song and artist during the final on 13 March 2015. All shows took place at the ORF Center in Vienna, hosted by Mirjam Weichselbraun and broadcast on ORF eins as well as streamed online via ORF's official website.

Format
Three pre-recorded shows were aired on 20 February, 27 February and 6 March 2015. Sixteen artists competed in the first show where an expert jury panel selected the top six to advance in the competition. The second show was a non-competitive showcase show where the six remaining artists showcased their vocal skills and talent. The six artists each performed two candidate Eurovision songs in the third show where an expert jury panel selected one song per artist for the final on 13 March 2015. The six artists performed their selected songs in the final where the winner was selected over two rounds of voting. In the first round, public voting and ten international juries consisting of five members each selected the top two entries to advance to the second round. Viewers were able to vote via telephone or SMS and both the jury and public distributed points based on overall ranking as follows: 5 (lowest), 6, 7, 8, 10 and 12 (highest). After the combination of the jury and public votes, the top two entries proceeded to the second round where the winner was selected exclusively by public voting.

During the shows, four coaches provided commentary and feedback to the artists. The coaches were:

 Anna F. – singer-songwriter and musician
 Nazar – rapper
 Alec Völkel – member of German band The BossHoss
 Sascha Vollmer – member of German band The BossHoss

Competing entries
Sixteen artists were nominated by a team of music experts led by Anna F. and Alex Deutsch, which were revealed on 2 December 2014. After the six finalists were selected, the artists participated in a week-long songwriting camp held at the Schloss Wasserburg in St. Pölten where they worked with the coaches and a songwriting team to create their two candidate Eurovision songs. Among the members of the songwriting team were Julie Frost (wrote Germany's Eurovision Song Contest 2010 winning song "Satellite"), Jimmy Harry (producer of hits for Bruno Mars, Pink and Madonna), Lukas Hillebrand and Wolfgang Schlögel (I-Wolf das Projekt).

Shows
The first three shows aired on 20 February, 27 February and 6 March 2015. Each of the sixteen artists performed an original song or a cover version of a hit international song in the first show where the top six were selected by the votes from a jury panel. The members of the expert panel were Dietmar Lienbacher (Head of Sony Music Austria), Diana Lueger (singer, member of the band Zweitfrau), Andi Knoll (Austrian commentator for the Eurovision Song Contest), and music experts Eberhard Forcher and Dunja Stachl. Each of the six finalists performed two original songs or cover versions of hit international songs in the second show and an advisory audience vote selected Celina Ann, Folkshilfe and The Makemakes as the top three. The six finalists performed their two candidate Eurovision songs in the third show and the coaches selected one song per artist to proceed to the final.

Final
The televised final took place on 13 March 2015. Six songs competed in the first round where the top two were selected by the combination of votes from ten international juries and a public vote to proceed to the second round. The top two were "Feel Alive" performed by Dawa and "I Am Yours" performed by The Makemakes. In the second round, public televoting selected "I Am Yours" performed by The Makemakes as the winner. In addition to the performances of the competing entries, Eurovision Song Contest 2014 winner Conchita Wurst performed her new single "Unstoppable".

Ratings

Promotion 
The Makemakes made several appearances across Europe to specifically promote "I Am Yours" as the Austrian Eurovision entry. On 18 April, The Makemakes performed during the Eurovision in Concert event which was held at the Melkweg venue in Amsterdam, Netherlands and hosted by Cornald Maas and Edsilia Rombley. On 26 April, The Makemakes performed during the London Eurovision Party, which was held at the Café de Paris venue in London, United Kingdom and hosted by Nicki French and Paddy O'Connell. The Makemakes also completed promotional activities in the Czech Republic, Estonia, Hungary, Poland, Romania, Russia, Serbia and Slovenia as part of the campaign Vienna 12 Points. In addition to their international appearances, The Makemakes performed during the ORF 2 programme Die Brieflos Show on 22 March.

At Eurovision 

All countries except the "Big Five" (France, Germany, Italy, Spain and the United Kingdom) and the host country, are required to qualify from one of two semi-finals in order to compete for the final; the top ten countries from each semi-final progress to the final. In the 2015 contest, Australia also competed directly in the final as an invited guest nation. As the host country, Austria automatically qualified to compete in the final on 14 May 2016. In addition to their participation in the final, Austria is also required to broadcast and vote in one of the two semi-finals. During the semi-final allocation draw on 26 January 2015, Austria was assigned to broadcast and vote in the first semi-final on 19 May 2015.

The two semi-finals and the final were broadcast in Austria on ORF eins with commentary by Andi Knoll. The Austrian spokesperson, who announced the Austrian votes during the final, was Kati Bellowitsch.

Final
The Makemakes took part in technical rehearsals on 17 and 20 May, followed by dress rehearsals on 22 and 23 May. This included the jury final on 22 May where the professional juries of each country watched and voted on the competing entries. As the host nation, Austria's running order position in the final was decided through a random draw that took place during the Heads of Delegation meeting in Vienna on 16 March 2015. Austria was drawn to perform in position 14. Following the second semi-final, the shows' producers decided upon the running order of the final rather than through another draw, so that similar songs were not placed next to each other. While Austria had already been drawn to perform in position 14, it was determined that Austria would perform following Belgium and before the entry from Greece.

The Austrian performance featured the members of The Makemakes, dressed in a black and white outfits, performing in a band set-up on a predominantly dark stage accompanied by bronze stage lighting. During the performance, lead vocalist of the band Dominic Muhrer was seated at a piano which set on fire at the final chorus of the song. The Makemakes was joined by three off-stage backing vocalists: Chris Coras, Harald Baumgartner and Regina Mallinger. Austria placed twenty-sixth in the final, failing to score any points. The nation initially tied with Germany as both countries finished with zero points, however, due to a tiebreaker rule that favours the song performed earliest in the running order, Austria was placed twenty-sixth, while Germany placed twenty-seventh. This was the fourth time Austria received nul points. In response to receiving zero points, the group later recorded a parody video singing the winning song "Heroes", changing the lyrics to "We are the zeroes of our time".

Voting
Voting during the three shows consisted of 50 percent public televoting and 50 percent from a jury deliberation. The jury consisted of five music industry professionals who were citizens of the country they represent, with their names published before the contest to ensure transparency. This jury was asked to judge each contestant based on: vocal capacity; the stage performance; the song's composition and originality; and the overall impression by the act. In addition, no member of a national jury could be related in any way to any of the competing acts in such a way that they cannot vote impartially and independently. The individual rankings of each jury member were released shortly after the grand final.

Following the release of the full split voting by the EBU after the conclusion of the competition, it was revealed that Austria had placed twenty-seventh (last) with the public televote and thirteenth with the jury vote. In the public vote, Austria scored 0 points and in the jury vote the nation scored 40 points.

Below is a breakdown of points awarded to Austria and awarded by Austria in the first semi-final and grand final of the contest, and the breakdown of the jury voting and televoting conducted during the two shows:

Points awarded to Austria
Austria did not receive any points at the 2015 Eurovision Song Contest.

Points awarded by Austria

Detailed voting results
The following members comprised the Austrian jury:
 Gary Lux (jury chairperson)producer, writer, composer, singer, musician, represented Austria in the 1983 contest as part of Westend, the 1985 contest and the 1987 contest
 Manuel Ortegasinger-songwriter, represented Austria in the 2002 contest
 Christian Deixsinger-songwriter, producer, arranger, actor, journalist
  (Como)singer-songwriter, composer, pianist, musician
 Franziska Trostmusic journalist

Notes and references

Notes

References

2015
Countries in the Eurovision Song Contest 2015
Eurovision